Euzopherodes vapidella, the yam moth or citrus stub moth, is a species of snout moth in the genus Euzopherodes. It was described by Josef Johann Mann in 1857. It is found in Spain, Portugal, France, Switzerland, Austria, the Balkan Peninsula, Sardinia, Sicily, Israel, Egypt, Morocco, Ivory Coast, Nigeria and western Africa.

Adults are fruit piercers and are considered a pest on Citrus species.

The larvae feed on Dioscorea alata and Dioscorea cayenensis.

References

Moths described in 1857
Phycitini
Moths of Europe
Moths of Asia